Cheng Zihua (June 20, 1905 – March 30, 1991) was a People's Republic of China politician. He was born in Yuncheng, Shanxi Province. He was the 1st Chinese Communist Party Committee Secretary and governor of his home province. He was a delegate to the 3rd (1964-1975), 4th (1975-1978) and 5th (1978-1983) National People's Congress.

References

1905 births
1991 deaths
People's Republic of China politicians from Shanxi
Chinese Communist Party politicians from Shanxi
Governors of Shanxi
Political office-holders in Shanxi
Ministers of Civil Affairs of the People's Republic of China
People's Liberation Army generals from Shanxi
Politicians from Yuncheng
Delegates to the 3rd National People's Congress
Delegates to the 4th National People's Congress
Delegates to the 5th National People's Congress
Vice Chairpersons of the National Committee of the Chinese People's Political Consultative Conference